The Canadian Group of Painters (CGP) was a collective of 28 painters from across Canada who came together as a group in 1933.

Formation  
The Canadian Group of Painters succeeded the disbanded Group of Seven, whose paintings of the Canadian wilderness had been a strong influence on Canadian art. In the early 1930s, the Group of Seven's prominence had caused controversy as many believed that the National Gallery of Canada exhibited favouritism for their work and they were the only Canadian artists to receive global recognition. Concern over the Gallery's potential bias and exclusion of modern artists led to the formation of the Canadian Group of Painters in February 1933.

The group was made up of 28 different English-speaking painters from across Canada with Lawren Harris as their inaugural president. Several of the other Group of Seven painters were also included in the new group including A. J. Casson, Arthur Lismer, A. Y. Jackson, F.H. Varley and Franklin Carmichael.

Although the group never created a manifesto, they lived and worked with two objectives: to foster closer cooperation between Canadian artists and to encourage and cultivate Canadian artistic expression.

History
Their first exhibition of "nationalist art" was held in Atlantic City, New Jersey in November 1933. They showcased 57 works at the Heinz Art Salon, which proved to be a great international venue to showcase their brand. However, the pieces that gained the most recognition and press were still the Group of Seven works. The first CGP exhibition in Canada was held in November 1933. The exhibit was less restrictive in style and featured a wider range of works that fell outside of the Canadian landscape style.

Their next exhibition was not held until January 1936 at the Art Gallery of Toronto. The significant delay was caused by a variety of scandals between group members, including an affair between Lawren Harris and Bess Larkin Housser, fellow artist and the wife of CGP's secretary, Fred Housser. Harris stepped down as president and A. Y. Jackson took the lead with vice presidents Arthur Lismer and Prudence Heward in 1936.  The group held a number of exhibitions under their new leadership and were making strides towards a unified style.

The Eastern Group of Painters was formed in Montreal, Quebec in 1938 to counteract the influence of the Canadian Group of Painters.

Influence
As active painters and as a group they continued to produce and influence Canadian art for many years. The Canadian Group of Painters organized exhibitions of the works of the Beaver Hall Group. Walter Yarwood, who was a member of the Canadian Group of Painters, was also a founding member of Painters Eleven.

A Vital Force: The Canadian Group of Painters (CGP) (2013), which was curated by Alicia Boutilier for the Agnes Etherington Art Centre, was the first major touring exhibition to focus exclusively on the CGP in an exhibition of major paintings from public and private collections across Canada.

Members

1933 founding members

 Bertram Brooker
 Franklin Carmichael
 Emily Carr
 A.J. Casson
 Charles Comfort
 L.L. FitzGerald
 Bess Harris
 Lawren Harris
 Prudence Heward

 Randolph S. Hewton
 Edwin Holgate
 Yvonne McKague Housser
 A.Y. Jackson
 Arthur Lismer
 Jock Macdonald
 Thoreau MacDonald
 H. Mabel May
 Isabel McLaughlin

 Lilias Torrance Newton
 Will Ogilvie
 George Pepper
 Sarah Robertson
 Albert H. Robinson
 Anne Savage
 Charles H. Scott
 F. H. Varley
 W. P. Weston
 W. J. Wood

1935–1940 additions

 André Charles Biéler
 John Martin Alfsen
 Paraskeva Clark
 Rody Kenny Courtice
 Bobs Cogill Haworth
 Pegi Nicol MacLeod
 Kathleen Daly
 Carl Schaefer
 Gordon Webber

 Caven Atkins
 Peter Haworth
 Jack Humphrey
 Mabel Lockerby
 Henri Masson
 David Milne
 Kathleen Morris
 Louis Muhlstock
 Ethel Seath

1942–1954 additions

 Fritz Brandtner
 Goodridge Roberts
 Marian Dale Scott
 Jack Nichols
 William Winter
 Edna Taçon
 E. Michael Mitchell

 E. J. Hughes
 Jack Bush
 B. C. Binning
 Stanley Cosgrove
 L. A. C. Panton
 Jacques de Tonnancour
 Roloff Beny
 Lionel Thomas

Select group exhibitions
 1933: Heinz Art Salon, NJ
 1936: Art Gallery of Ontario
 1937: Art Gallery of Ontario
 1937: Art Gallery of Ontario
 1938: National Gallery of Canada
 1939: New York World's Fair, NY
 1940: Art Association of Montreal, QC
 1951: Montreal Museum of Fine Arts, QC
 1953: Art Gallery of Ontario
 1993: Pilgrims in the Wilderness: The Struggle of the Canadian Group of Painters (1933-1969), the Robert McLaughlin Gallery, Oshawa
 2013: A Vital Force: The Canadian Group of Painters, Agnes Etherington Art Centre, Kingston

References

 
Canadian artist groups and collectives